The 39th German Skeleton Championship 2005 was held on 8 January 2006 in Altenberg, Germany.

Men

Women

External links 
 Resultlist at the BSD Site

Skeleton championships in Germany
2005 in German sport
2005 in skeleton
Sport in Altenberg, Saxony
2000s in Saxony